Marcela Constanza Sabat Fernández (born 4 April 1981) is a Chilean lawyer and politician who served as a Senator.

References

External links
BCN Profile

1981 births
Living people
Chilean politicians

National Renewal (Chile) politicians
University for Development alumni
Finis Terrae University alumni
Adolfo Ibáñez University alumni
Senators of the LV Legislative Period of the National Congress of Chile